CHNE-TV is a community channel in the community of Chéticamp, Nova Scotia.

External links
 
CHNE-TV history - Canadian Communication Foundation

HNE
Canadian community channels
HNE
Television channels and stations established in 1983
1983 establishments in Nova Scotia